Ampasimaneva is a village in Anosibe An'ala District, Alaotra-Mangoro Region, Madagascar.
It has a population of approx. 2000 inhabitants and is situated at a distance of 180 km from the capital of Antananarivo.

Rivers
Amasimaneva is situated at the Mangoro River.

References

Populated places in Alaotra-Mangoro